Schoolfield may refer to:

People
 George C. Schoolfield (1925–2016), American professor
 Kent Schoolfield (born 1946), American football player

Places
 Schoolfield, Virginia, previous name for Danville, Virginia